Hurricane Kenna was the fourth-most intense tropical cyclone on record in the Eastern Pacific basin, and at the time the third-most intense Pacific hurricane to strike the west coast of Mexico. Kenna was the sixteenth tropical depression, thirteenth tropical storm, seventh hurricane, sixth major hurricane, and third Category 5 hurricane of the 2002 Pacific hurricane season. After forming on October 22 to the south of Mexico from a tropical wave, forecasters consistently predicted the storm to strengthen much less than it actually did.

The name "Kenna" was retired from the list of Pacific hurricane names due to its effects on Mexico, which included US$101 million in damage and four deaths. The worst of the hurricane's effects occurred between San Blas in Nayarit and Puerto Vallarta in Jalisco, where over 100 people were injured and thousands of homes and businesses were damaged or destroyed. 95% of the buildings in San Blas were damaged, and hundreds of buildings were destroyed along coastal areas of Puerto Vallarta.

Meteorological history
 The origin of Hurricane Kenna can be traced to a tropical wave moving westward through the Caribbean Sea on October 16, possibly the same wave that passed near Barbados two days earlier. The wave entered the eastern Pacific Ocean on October 19, and a tropical disturbance along the wave axis gradually became better organized. Conditions favored continued development, and Dvorak classifications began late on October 20. Initially the depression was disorganized, with little inner convective structure and sporadic deep convection. Computer models predicted an increase in wind shear by 60 hours; as such the National Hurricane Center forecast the depression to strengthen to a peak strength of  before weakening.

The depression quickly became better organized with a great increase in convection near the center, and six hours after forming it strengthened into Tropical Storm Kenna. Upper-level outflow and banding features improved in an organization, as well. The storm moved to the west-northwest around the periphery of a mid-level high-pressure system, and initially failed to strengthen further with much of its convection being associated with outer rainbands. On October 23, the outer rainbands dissipated and convection became more concentrated near the center, which coincided with a steady increase in strength.

A Reconnaissance Aircraft flight into the hurricane while it was near peak intensity recorded a pressure of 913 mbar (hPa), the fourth lowest recorded pressure for a Pacific hurricane.

Despite a 27 mbar increase in pressure in 12 hours, convective activity increased prior to Kenna making landfall. Hurricane Kenna was at the time, the third most intense Pacific hurricane to strike Mexico. The hurricane rapidly weakened over the mountainous terrain of western Mexico, and the circulation dissipated on October 26 over the Sierra Madre Occidental mountains. The remnants continued northeastward into the Gulf of Mexico and the southeastern United States later that day, producing rainfall across the region.

Preparations

About 27 hours before landfall, Mexican officials issued a hurricane watch from Mazatlán to Cabo Corrientes, Jalisco, with a tropical storm watch issued further south to Manzanillo. Six hours later when its track became more apparent, the watch was upgraded to a hurricane warning from Mazatlán to La Fortuna, with a tropical storm warning southward to Manzanillo.

Roughly 8,800 of the 9,000 residents in the landfall location, San Blas, evacuated, which ultimately contributed to a low death toll. Officials ordered for the evacuation of 50,000 residents and fishermen along the southwest coast of Mexico, including 3,000 in the Islas Marías, 10,000 near Mazatlán, and 15,000 near flood-prone areas. Civil authorities closed all schools and docks in potentially affected areas. The Mexican Red Cross prepared for the storm by shipping 215 tonnes of relief supplies such as food, water, clothing, and medicine to the Red Cross branch in Jalisco. Assistance from the Yucatán Peninsula delivered 10 tonnes of food and water, as well. The Mexican Red Cross prepared 20 emergency shelters in the state of Nayarit. Officials took security measures in Los Cabos, Baja California Sur, where the Asia-Pacific Economic Cooperation was meeting during the passage of the hurricane. Early forecasts indicated a possible threat to the meeting, causing the government to prepare for a potential alternate site. Officials recommended boats to stay at port due to severe conditions.

Impact

Few official surface observations are available for the passage of the hurricane. Upon making landfall, Kenna was accompanied with an estimated  storm surge in San Blas. The surge also affected Puerto Vallarta, with reports of  waves rushing inland from the bay. There, sustained winds reached an estimated . The hurricane also produced heavy rainfall in Guerrero, Michoacán, Colima, and Jalisco, and hit Baja California Sur with strong winds and rough seas.

In San Blas, strong winds from the hurricane damaged or destroyed 95% of the homes, with 1,540 houses damaged and 8,800 people affected. An elderly woman died in the city when the wall of her house collapsed on her. Large portions of the city were covered with building debris and sand washed from the ocean. Elsewhere in Nayarit, flying debris killed a person in Santiago Escuintla. There, two elderly men drowned, one by falling into a river. Both were believed to have been killed during the storm as they fled their homes. In Santiago Ixcuintla, the hurricane damaged 3,770 homes, and throughout Nayarit, strong winds from the hurricane destroyed the roofs of hundreds of houses. Federal authorities lost communications with at least 30 Indian villages due to the high winds of the hurricane. Kenna destroyed the entire banana, tobacco, and tomato crops in the rural areas of San Blas, Tecuala, and Acaponeta, leaving more than 700 subsistence farmers and their families in need of water and food.

Waist-deep floodwaters swept away vans and cars, ruining several vehicles. The passage of the hurricane destroyed 150 stores near the ocean and extensively damaged three hotels. Damage to the city's port was minor.

The hurricane injured at least 52 in Puerto Vallarta and dozens in San Blas from widespread flying glass and other forms of debris, with two people seriously injured due to the hurricane. Ten municipalities suffered substantial damage, with insured damage in Mexico totaling . Rainfall from the hurricane spread across northern Mexico, causing minor flash floods and mudslides.

The remnants of Kenna entered the south-central United States on October 26, resulting in enhanced rainfall in various locations.

Aftermath

After the season had ended, the World Meteorological Organization retired the name Kenna and replaced it with Karina.

The Mexican government declared the region in Nayarit near the landfall of Kenna as a disaster area, allowing for the usage of emergency funds. Immediately after the passage of the hurricane, the Mexican Red Cross prepared 180 technical staff and volunteers from seven states to deliver 125 MT of food, medicine, and clothes to the areas most affected. The Mexican government deployed the Mexican Army to the area to remove fallen trees and establish water treatment plants to assist the affected population. The Mexican Navy was sent to assist to support medical personnel in the San Blas area, and the government Department for Family Development assisted the Mexican Red Cross in delivering food. Grupo Modelo, brewers of Corona beer, sent 6,600 gallons (25,000 liters) of drinking water and 1000 food sets for the San Blas area.

Backhoes and dump trucks gradually removed the debris and sand from San Blas. Dozens of storeowners, municipal employees, and volunteers in Puerto Vallarta worked to clear the debris caused by the storm. The remaining stores, bars, and shops placed signs on their windows describing they were open in an effort to attract the tourists still in the town. By about two months after the hurricane, most hotels, restaurants, and shops were reopened.

See also

List of Pacific hurricanes
Hurricane Willa – A similarly intense Category 5 hurricane that took a nearly identical track in late October 2018.
Hurricane Patricia – The strongest and most intense tropical cyclone ever recorded in the Western Hemisphere, took a nearly identical track in late October 2015.

References

External links

Tropical Cyclone Report – Hurricane Kenna
HPC rainfall report for Kenna

Kenna
2002 in Mexico
Kenna
Kenna
Kenna
Hurricanes in Guerrero
Hurricanes in Michoacán
Hurricanes in Colima
Hurricanes in Jalisco
Hurricanes in Baja California Sur